Charles Jenkins Laboratories was founded in by Charles Francis Jenkins, developer of the Phantoscope, the first commercial tv station W3XK and the first commercial television company.

History 

Charles Francis Jenkins in 1890 moved to Washington D.C. to work as an Steganographer, then he experimented with motion pictures and in 1890 developed a movie projector called the Phantoscope, the laboratory was created years after it.

Transmission of Pictures over Wireless 

In March 13, 1922 Charles Jenkins filed the U.S. patent No. 1,544,156 for Transmition of Pictures over Wireless, it was granted on June 30, 1925.

W3XK, the first commercial TV station in the US 

In 1928 Charles Jenkins was granted the first commercial television license in the United States and In July 2, 1928 Jenkins Television Corporation started to operate W3XK, the first TV station. first aired from Jenkins Labs in Washington and from 1929 on from Wheaton, Maryland, five nights a week. At first, the station could only send silhouette images due to its narrow bandwidth, but that was soon rectified and real black-and-white images were transmitted.

Jenkins Television Corporation 

In December 1928, Charles Jenkins founded in New Jersey the Jenkins Television Corporation to produce and manufacture Radiovisors. In March 1932, Jenkins Television Corporation was liquidated and its assets acquired by Lee de Forest Radio Corporation. Within months, the De Forest company went bankrupt and the assets were bought by RCA stopping all work on electromechanical television.

W2XCR 

The Laboratories also operated experimental station W2XCR, it operated a Jenkins mechanical scanner through the experimental transmitter, W2XCR. The station broadcast using both 48-line, 15 frame/s, and 60-line, 20 frame/s standards during 1931.

Closure 

Charles Jenkins Laboratories closed after Mr. Jenkins died in 1934.

See also 

 W3XK
 W2XCR
 Charles Francis Jenkins

References

Defunct companies based in Maryland
Television in the United States
Defunct television broadcasting companies of the United States